Aski Mahalleh may refer to:
 Aski Mahalleh, Amol
 Aski Mahalleh, Dabudasht, Amol County